Aubrey Johnston (7 September 1882 – 16 June 1960) was an Australian cricketer. He played two first-class matches for New South Wales in 1904/05.

See also
 List of New South Wales representative cricketers

References

External links
 

1882 births
1960 deaths
Australian cricketers
New South Wales cricketers
Cricketers from Sydney